Spencer Dock is a stop on the Luas light-rail tram system in Dublin, Ireland.  It opened in 2009 as one of four stops on an extension of the Red Line through the docklands to The Point.  The stop is located on a section of Mayor Street Upper which is closed to other traffic, just next to Central Square.  It provides access to many of the developments in the area, including Convention Centre Dublin.

It is located  200m east of the Spencer Dock Bridge which carries the LUAS over the Royal Canal.

Spencer Dock is served by Dublin Bus routes 33D, 33X, 53A, 142, 151, 53A and 90  and is the closest Luas stop to Docklands railway station, approximately 350m walk away.

References

Luas Red Line stops in Dublin (city)